HD 219134 (also known as Gliese 892 or HR 8832) is a main-sequence star in the constellation of Cassiopeia. It is smaller and less luminous than the Sun, with a spectral class of K3V, which makes it an orange-hued star. HD 219134 is relatively close to our system, with an estimated distance of 21.34 light years. This star is close to the limit of apparent magnitude that can still be seen by the unaided eye. The limit is considered to be magnitude 6 for most observers. This star has a magnitude 9.4 optical companion at an angular separation of 106.6 arcseconds.

Planetary system 
HD 219134 has a system of six known exoplanets. The innermost planet, HD 219134 b, is a rocky super-Earth based on size (1.6 times the size of Earth), and density (6.4 grams per cubic cm). This and three additional exoplanets; one super-Earth (designated c and later found to be rocky as well), one Neptunian world (d), and one Jovian world (e); were deduced using HARPS-N radial velocity data by Motalebi et al. in 2015. Two months later, Vogt et al. published a paper on this system which found a 6-planet solution, with planets b, c & d corresponding to those in Motalebi et al., f & g being new planets, and h corresponding to Motalebi's e but with different, and more accurate, estimated parameters.

A number of independent studies have been done regarding the planetary system of HD 219134, with some of their results conflicting with each other. As of March 2017, the star is known to have at least 5 planets, with two of them (HD 219134 b and c) known to be transiting, rocky super-Earths. While a 2016 study suggested that the radial velocity signal corresponding to planet f might be caused by stellar activity, it has been confirmed by subsequent studies in 2017 and 2021. Planet g has not been reported by subsequent studies, and a 2020 study did not find evidence of its claimed 94-day period, but instead found a period of 192 days.

Habitable Zone 
The conservative habitable zone (CHZ) of HD 219134 is estimated to extend from 0.516 to 0.948 AU. None of the planets orbiting the star are confirmed to orbit inside the habitable zone. The planet candidate HD 219134 g may orbit slightly interior to the inner edge of the habitable zone based on its initially published parameters, or may orbit within the habitable zone based on a more recent estimated orbital period of 192 days and semi-major axis of 0.603 AU. This planet is significantly more massive than Earth and therefore it likely retains a dense atmosphere, comparable to the Solar System's ice giants.

References

External links
 

Cassiopeia (constellation)
0892
K-type main-sequence stars
Gliese, 0892
Suspected variables
219134
8832
114622
Durchmusterung objects
Planetary systems with six confirmed planets
Planetary transit variables